Sun Shaocheng (born July 1960) is a Chinese politician currently serving as party secretary of Inner Mongolia. Previously, he served as Minister of Veterans Affairs, vice-minister of Land and Resources, vice-minister of Civil Affairs, vice-governor of Shanxi, and vice-governor of Shandong. He served two separate terms as vice-minister of Ministry of Civil Affairs, from April 2009 to August 2012 and from February 2017 to June 2017. He is a member of the 19th CPC Central Committee. He is a member of the 19th National Congress of the Chinese Communist Party.

Education
Sun was born in Haiyang, Shandong in July 1960. He entered Shandong University in August 1980, majoring in Chinese language and literature at the Department of Chinese language, where he graduated in July 1984. After graduation, he entered the workforce, and joined the Chinese Communist Party in May 1986. He earned his doctor's degree in the science of law from Peking University in 2002. He was also studied at the Central Party School of the Chinese Communist Party as a part-time student.

Career
In July 1984, he was appointed as an official in the Ministry of Civil Affairs and over a period of 25 years worked his way up to the position of Vice-Minister.

In August 2012, he became the vice-governor of Shandong, a position he held until September 2014. Then he was transferred to Shanxi, a province rich in coal resources, he was a Standing Committee of the CPC Shanxi Provincial Committee and director of its United Front Work Department. He was promoted to vice-governor of Shanxi in November 2016, but having held the position for only three months, he was transferred back to Beijing and appointed the vice-minister of Ministry of Civil Affairs again, but soon he was transferred to another post as vice-minister of Ministry of Land and Resources. On March 19, 2018, he was confirmed as the inaugural Minister of Veterans Affairs at the first session of the 13th National People's Congress.

On 30 April 2022, he was appointed party secretary of Inner Mongolia, the top political position in the region.

References 

1960 births
Politicians from Yantai
Living people
Shandong University alumni
Peking University alumni
Central Party School of the Chinese Communist Party alumni
PLA National Defence University alumni
Political office-holders in Inner Mongolia
People's Republic of China politicians from Shandong
Chinese Communist Party politicians from Shandong
Members of the 19th Central Committee of the Chinese Communist Party
People from Haiyang